Richard Louis Elliott is the principal organist of the Tabernacle Choir at Temple Square.

Biography 
Elliott was born and raised in Baltimore, Maryland. He originally planned to become a studio musician and studied organ as part of this goal. In his late teens Elliott was part of a rock band.

After joining the Church of Jesus Christ of Latter-day Saints (LDS Church) he decided to change his goals.  After studies at the preparatory division of the Peabody Conservatory and the Catholic University of America, he received a bachelor's degree from the Curtis Institute of Music while also serving as an assistant organist for the Wanamaker Organ. It was while he was a student at Curtis that Elliott joined the LDS Church. He served a mission for the LDS Church in Argentina from 1981 to 1983.

Elliott received Master of Music and Doctor of Musical Arts degrees from the Eastman School of Music, studying under David Craighead. He then became a professor of music at Brigham Young University.  He was appointed a tabernacle organist when Robert Cundick retired in 1991.  In addition to accompanying the Tabernacle Choir and giving recitals at Temple Square, Elliott has recorded many organ pieces with various labels and occasionally gives organ recitals at various locations across the United States.  Several of Elliott's arrangements for organ have been published, many by Jackman Music.

Personal life 
Elliott is married to the former Elizabeth Cox Ballantyne, a pianist. They met while both were students at the Eastman School of Music and have two sons.

References

Deseret News Aug 6, 2011
Tabernacle Choir bio of Elliott
review of organ recital Elliott gave in the Cleveland area
churchofjesuschrist.org bio of Elliott
Deseret News April 30, 2011
LDS Living article on Elliott

Tabernacle Choir organists
Latter Day Saints from Pennsylvania
Converts to Mormonism
Catholic University of America alumni
Curtis Institute of Music alumni
Eastman School of Music alumni
Brigham Young University faculty
Living people
Latter Day Saints from Maryland
Latter Day Saints from New York (state)
Latter Day Saints from Utah
21st-century organists
American organists
Year of birth missing (living people)